Kangerluarsuk Tulleq (old spelling: Kangerdluarssuk Tugdleq) is a  long fjord in the Qeqqata municipality in western Greenland. The fjord is of roughly east–west orientation, emptying into Davis Strait in the west.

Geography 

To the northwest, undulating terrain under Akornata Qaqqaa mountain constitutes the terminal point of a long mountain range extending from the Pingu mountain group halfway between Davis Strait and the Greenland ice sheet. The range flattens considerably towards the east in the area of Kangaamiut dike swarm north of Kangerlussuaq, due to pressure exerted by the icesheet for long periods in the past.

To the south, the fjord is bounded by the long Majoriaq range, culminating in the west in the Ujarasussuliup Qaqqaa and Palasip Qaqqaa mountains. The east–west range continues through Aappilattorsuaq massif to the east, connecting with the northern range to the northeast of the head of the fjord.

Settlement 
There are no settlements on the shores of the fjord. The closest settlement is Sisimiut to the southeast of Palasip Qaqqaa.

Tourism 

There are two utility huts at the head of the fjord, maintained by the authorities of Sisimiut. They serve as shelter for hikers on the Polar Route from Sisimiut to Kangerlussuaq, and for overnight dogsled trips from the town. The race was inaugurated in 1998, since then becoming an international competition.

References 

Davis Strait
Fjords of Greenland